The VDS-001 was an American closed-wheel sports prototype race car, designed, developed, and built by Racing Team VDS for the revived Can-Am series, in 1981. It is based on the Lola T530. Geoff Brabham won the 1981 Can-Am Championship with the car, despite only winning 2 of the 10 races that season. It won a further 4 races in 1982 Can-Am Championship in 1982, being driven by Al Holbert. It was later exported to England, where it competed in the British Thundersports series, and achieved great success. Its sports car racing career spanned 9 years (1981-1988), and over that period of time, it won a total of 19 races, achieved a total of 26 podium finishes, and scored 21 pole positions. As with most Can-Am cars of the time, it was powered by a  Chevrolet small-block motor.

References

Sports prototypes
Can-Am cars
Lola racing cars